Michael Joseph Carmody (born 9 February 1966 in Huddersfield) is an English former professional footballer who played as a midfielder for Huddersfield Town and Tranmere Rovers in the Football League.

Playing career
Carmody began his career at non-League Emley, before signing for Huddersfield Town in the 1984–85 season. After making eight appearances, he returned to Emley for the 1985–86 season. He subsequently signed for Tranmere Rovers, making two appearances in the 1986–87 season, before returning to Emley again. He played for the club in the 1988 FA Vase final, before following Emley manager Gerry Quinn to Altrincham in 1992. He was appointed captain in 1994, and made 255 appearances for the club over eight years. He was loaned to Ashton United (then managed by Quinn) during the 1999–2000 season, before signing for the club permanently. He later played for Brodsworth Miners Welfare and Armthorpe Welfare.

References

1966 births
Living people
Footballers from Huddersfield
Association football midfielders
English footballers
English Football League players
Huddersfield Town A.F.C. players
Wakefield F.C. players
Tranmere Rovers F.C. players
Altrincham F.C. players
Ashton United F.C. players
Brodsworth Welfare A.F.C. players
English football managers
Armthorpe Welfare F.C. managers